This is a list of limits for common functions such as elementary functions. In this article, the terms a, b and c are constants with respect to SM

Limits for general functions

Definitions of limits and related concepts 
 if and only if  This is the (ε, δ)-definition of limit.

A function, is said to be continuous at a point, c, if

Operations on a single known limit 

If  then:

 if L is not equal to 0.
  if n  is a positive integer
 if n is a positive integer, and if n is even, then L > 0.
In general, if g(x) is continuous at L and  then

Operations on two known limits 
If  and  then:

Limits involving derivatives or infinitesimal changes

. This is the definition of the derivative. All differentiation rules can also be reframed as rules involving limits. For example, if g(x) is differentiable at x,
. This is the chain rule.
. This is the product rule.

Inequalities 

If  and for all x in an open interval that contains c, except possibly c itself,
 This is known as the squeeze theorem. This applies even in the cases that f(x) and g(x) take on different values at c, or are discontinuous at c.

Polynomials and functions of the form xa

Polynomials in x 

 if n is a positive integer

In general, if is a polynomial then, by the continuity of polynomials,  This is also true for rational functions, as they are continuous on their domains.

Functions of the form xa 

 In particular,

. In particular,

Exponential functions

Functions of the form ag(x) 
, due to the continuity of

Functions of the form xg(x)

Functions of the form f(x)g(x) 

. This limit can be derived from this limit.

Sums, products and composites 

 for all positive a.

Logarithmic functions

Natural logarithms 
In particular,

. This limit follows from L'Hôpital's rule.

Logarithms to arbitrary bases 
For b > 1,

For b < 1,

Both cases can be generalized to:

Trigonometric functions
If  is expressed in radians:

These limits both follow from the continuity of sin and cos.

. Or, in general,
, for a not equal to 0.

, for b not equal to 0.

, for integer n.
. Or, in general,
, for a not equal to 0.
, for b not equal to 0.
, where x0 is an arbitrary real number.
, where d is the Dottie number. x0 can be any arbitrary real number.

Sums 
In general, any infinite series is the limit of its partial sums. For example, an analytic function is the limit of its Taylor series, within its radius of convergence. 

. This is known as the harmonic series.
. This is the Euler Mascheroni constant.

Notable special limits

.
.

Limiting behavior

Asymptotic equivalences

Asymptotic equivalences, are true if . Therefore, they can also be reframed as limits. Some notable asymptotic equivalences include
, due to the prime number theorem, where π(x) is the prime counting function.
, due to Stirling's approximation, .

Big O notation
The behaviour of functions described by Big O notation can also be described by limits. For example

 if

References

Limits (mathematics)
Limits
Functions and mappings